Special Branch, abbreviated as SB, was established in 1934 under the Crime Department of the Royal Hong Kong Police Force. The Branch disbanded in 1995 in the final days of colonial period.

History

Early days 
In the face of a perceived direct Communist threat to Hong Kong, an Anti-Communist Squad was established in the Criminal Investigation Department of the then Royal Hong Kong Police Force by 1930. It was named the Political Department in Chinese (政治部). In 1933 (some sources said 1934), the squad's English name became "Special Branch" while its Chinese name remained unchanged. The Branch was said to be under MI5 with assistance from MI6, and became part of the Hong Kong police in 1946, focusing on the prevention of pro-CCP leftists and pro-KMT rightists infiltrating Hong Kong.

In addition to anti-subversion operations, its role during its first two decades also included immigration, passport control and registration of persons.

By 1949, then an elite division of the Criminal Investigation Division, Special Branch was manned by a large cohort of British officers brought in that year by Deputy Commissioner Peter Erwin, the Director Special Branch (DSB), to replace remnants of the prewar Shanghai Settlements police.  Under DSB John Prendergast (later Sir John), appointed Deputy Commissioner in 1960 to lead the division, Special Branch was considered a highly professional security apparatus, pursuing anti-corruption and anti-Triad duties in addition to intelligence and counter-subversion operations.  By 1977, the branch strength had reached almost a thousand.

SB officers assigned to work in Hong Kong were encouraged to work alongside MI6 agents in penetrating mainland China due to a lack of intelligence success with their Far East Controller.

1980s and 1990s 
SB descriptions from 1983 did not mention its role of monitoring subversive activities due to the then ongoing Sino-British negotiations on returning Hong Kong back to China. In 1988, the SB stopped accepting new recruits.

The Branch provided help in the Operation Yellowbird, rescuing student activists following the 1989 Tiananmen massacre.

As the handover of Hong Kong was approaching, the Intelligence Wing was gradually dismissed, with the officials being settled in the United Kingdom after signing life-long non-disclosure agreements. The division was disbanded in 1995, prior to the transfer of the sovereignty of Hong Kong in 1997. Units of SB were reassigned under the Security Wing (Department B) – Crime and Security. 

The Security Wing, on the other hand, was merged to the Crime and Security Department on 1 July 1995, and is now responsible for the VIP Protection Unit. It took charge for continuing the work of the SB. The Intelligence Wing was eliminated and all related information was deleted to prevent it from being transferred to Chinese hands, although some files were sent back to London. The RHKPF's Special Branch did not leave any record of their work, owing to their intelligence duties. Some of them were turned over to the Hong Kong SAR government after it was established.

Recent declassified documents showed that the RHKPF's Special Branch was infiltrated by the intelligence service of the government of the Republic of China during the Cold War.

RHKPF SB officers were involved in using the Victoria Road Detention Centre, known as "White House", to interrogate pro-KMT agents trying to bring explosive into mainland China through Hong Kong and pro-communist agitators in the 1960s.

Organisation 
The Branch was consisted of two Wings: Intelligence Wing and Security Wing, and led by the Deputy Commissioner of Police, Senior Assistant Commissioner of Police, Assistant Commissioner of Police, and a Chief Superintendent of Police. 

Eight divisions were established, handling political vetting, anti-terrorism, intelligence, espionage, bugging socialists in Hong Kong, and preventing spies from China. 

 Special Branch
 Intelligence Wing
 Intelligence Division: preventing the infiltration of communists, gathering intelligence over socialist states.
 Support Division: providing technical support for counterintelligence, translation and intelligence analysis
 Security Wing
 Operations Division: monitoring communists across the globe and deal with subversions by CCP
 Counterintelligence Division: monitoring communists in Hong Kong, vetting police and protecting VIPs in Hong Kong

References

Further reading

See also 
National Security Department

Defunct United Kingdom intelligence agencies
Secret police
Hong Kong Police Force
1934 establishments in Hong Kong
1995 disestablishments in Hong Kong